Jeremiah Kolo is an Anglican bishop in Nigeria: he is the current Bishop of Kutigi, one of 11 dioceses within the Anglican Province of Lokoja, itself one of 14 provinces within the Church of Nigeria.

Notes

Living people
Anglican bishops of Kutigi
21st-century Anglican bishops in Nigeria
Year of birth missing (living people)